is a Japanese footballer currently playing as a forward for Yokohama FC.

Career statistics

Club
.

Notes

References

External links

1997 births
Living people
Sportspeople from Shizuoka Prefecture
Association football people from Shizuoka Prefecture
Nippon Sport Science University alumni
Japanese footballers
Association football forwards
J2 League players
Tokyo Verdy players
Yokohama FC players